Elcin Barker Ergun is a business leader in the pharmaceutical industry. In September 2019 she was appointed Chief Executive Officer and Member of the Board of Directors of the Italian company Menarini Group.

Biography 
Ergun graduated from TED Ankara College (high school) in Turkey, where she also played basketball and handball and was a member of the team that won the national championship three times. Elcin has a Bachelor of Science degree in computer engineering from Middle East Technical University in Ankara and an MBA from INSEAD (Institut Europeen d’Administration Des Affaires).  

Ergun's career started as a software engineer, working for five years in IT management in Amsterdam for ITT Corporation. After her MBA in France, Ergun moved to the UK, leading marketing and supply chain projects at the Northern European head office of Honeywell and later continued as subsidiary chief financial officer. Ergun entered the pharmaceutical industry as chief financial officer of the Turkish subsidiary of GlaxoSmithKline. 

After joining Merck KGaA's Healthcare business, Elcin took on roles of increasing seniority within the organisation becoming Executive Vice President and Head of Global Commercial for Merck Serono, achieving significant leadership and business transformation across global commercial operations. This followed her role as Senior Vice President and Head of Intercontinental Region, across the Middle East, Africa, and Russia/CIS countries.

Before she joined Menarini Group, Elcin was based in Boston for three years as Executive Vice President, Head of New Businesses at Merck Healthcare.

Under Ergun's leadership, Menarini has accomplished milestones such as the 2020 acquisition of Stemline Therapeutics, a U.S. commercial-stage biopharmaceutical company, formerly a public listed organization quoted on NASDAQ, focused on the development and commercialization of novel oncology therapeutics.

References 

Year of birth missing (living people)
Living people
Middle East Technical University alumni